Chen Yijun is a Chinese wheelchair fencer. He represented China at the 2012 Summer Paralympics and at the 2016 Summer Paralympics. In total he won two gold medals and one silver medal, all at the 2012 Summer Paralympics.

References

External links 
 

Living people
Year of birth missing (living people)
Place of birth missing (living people)
Chinese male foil fencers
Wheelchair fencers at the 2012 Summer Paralympics
Wheelchair fencers at the 2016 Summer Paralympics
Medalists at the 2012 Summer Paralympics
Paralympic gold medalists for China
Paralympic silver medalists for China
Paralympic medalists in wheelchair fencing
Paralympic wheelchair fencers of China
Chinese male sabre fencers
21st-century Chinese people